Grażyna is an 1823 narrative poem by Adam Mickiewicz, written in the summer of 1822 during a year-long sabbatical in Vilnius, while away from his teaching duties in Kaunas.

The poem describes the exploits of a mythical Lithuanian chieftainess Grażyna against the forces of the medieval Order of the Teutonic Knights. The woman character is believed to have been based on Mickiewicz's own sweetheart from Kaunas, Karolina Kowalska. The name was originally conceived by Mickiewicz himself, having used the root of the Lithuanian adjective graži, meaning "beautiful".

It was said by Polish writer Christien Ostrowski to have inspired Emilia Plater, a military heroine of the November 1830 Uprising.

In 1955, Ukrainian composer Boris Lyatoshinsky composed an eponymous orchestral work based on the poem in commemoration of the centenary of Mickiewicz's death.

References

External links
 Full text of Grażyna in Polish including Konrad Wallenrod, with both French and English translations, published in Paris in 1859, with foreword by Jan Tysiewicz.  Google books preview.

Polish poems
Works by Adam Mickiewicz
Lithuania in fiction